The SS Dunera was a British troopship.

References

Ships of the United Kingdom
1891 ships